Ptisana is a genus in the eusporangiate fern family Marattiaceae, comprising species historically treated in the genus Marattia. The establishment of this genus follows the 2008 work by Andrew G. Murdock, which supported recognition of this group on the basis of genetic analysis and morphology. Ptisana can be distinguished from Marattia by the presence of distinct sutures at the point of leaflet attachment, deeply cut synangia, and the absence of labiate sporangial apertures. The name Ptisana is derived from the Latin word for pearl barley, an allusion to the shape of the synangia.

Ptisana has a palaeotropical distribution, with the westernmost extreme of the range in Ascension Island and extending eastward through tropical Africa, Asia, and Oceania. Ferns in this genus are generally quite large, with fronds often reaching 2-3 meters in length; the one known exception to this is Ptisana rolandi-principis, a dwarf species endemic to the Plateau de Dogny in New Caledonia. The basal chromosome number for Ptisana is 2n=78, whereas the one count for Marattia in the strict sense is 2n=80. The type species for the genus is Ptisana salicina, the type specimen of which was collected on Norfolk Island.

Species
Ptisana africana  Christenh.  – East Africa
Ptisana ambulans Murdock & C.W.Chen – Solomon Islands
Ptisana attenutata (Labill.) Murdock – New Caledonia
Ptisana boivinii (Mett. ex Kuhn) Senterre & Rouhan – Madagascar
Ptisana boninensis (Nakai) Yonek. – Bonin Islands
Ptisana costulisora (Altson) Murdock – New Guinea and nearby islands
Ptisana decipiens Murdock & C.W.Chen – Solomon Islands
Ptisana fraxinea (Sm.) Murdock – Africa to India, including Indian Ocean islands
Ptisana grandifolia (Copel.) Murdock – New Guinea
Ptisana howeana (W.R.B. Oliver) Murdock – Lord Howe Island
Ptisana kingii  (Copel.) Christenh. – New Guinea
Ptisana koordersii  (Alderw.) Christenh. – Sulawesi
Ptisana laboudalloniana Senterre & I.Fabre – Seychelles
Ptisana melanesica (Kuhn) Murdock – New Guinea and nearby islands
Ptisana mertensiana (C. Presl) Murdock – Micronesia
Ptisana novoguineensis (Rosenst.) Murdock – New Guinea
Ptisana obesa (Christ) Murdock – New Guinea
Ptisana odontosora (Christ) Senterre & Rouhan – Guinea
Ptisana oreades (Domin) Murdock – northern Australia
Ptisana papuana (Alderw.) Murdock & C.W.Chen – Solomon Islands
Ptisana pellucida (C. Presl) Murdock – Malaysia and the Philippines
Ptisana platybasis (Copel.) Murdock – New Guinea
Ptisana purpurascens (de Vriese) Murdock – Ascension Island
Ptisana rigida (Alderw.) Murdock – New Guinea, Sulawesi
Ptisana robusta (Altson) Senterre & I.Fabre – São Tomé
Ptisana rolandi-principis (Rosenst.) Christenh. – New Caledonia
Ptisana salicifolia  (Schrad.) Senterre & Rouhan – South Africa, Zimbabwe, Malawi and Mozambique
Ptisana salicina (Sm.) Murdock – king fern; South Pacific islands, including New Guinea
Ptisana sambucina (Blume) Murdock – Malesia and Vietnam
Ptisana senterreana  Christenh.  – Cameroon, Gabon, Equatorial Guinea
Ptisana smithii (Mett. ex Kuhn) Murdock – Vanuatu, Fiji, Samoas, Tonga
Ptisana squamosa (Christ) Murdock – New Guinea
Ptisana sylvatica (Blume) Murdock – Malesia
Ptisana ternatea (de Vriese) Murdock – Moluccas, New Guinea, the Philippines
Ptisana wernerii  (Rosenst.) Christenh.

Phylogeny of Ptisana

References

Marattiidae
Fern genera